Emerson David Umaña Corleto (born November 12, 1981 in San Vicente, El Salvador) is a Salvadoran former professional football midfielder.

Club career
Umaña started his career at hometown club Independiente in the Salvadoran second division before a stint at Dragón in 2001. He then joined another second level team, Telecom, whom he left for top level FAS in 2003. He won three league titles while with FAS and after six years he moved on to Isidro Metapán before signing up with Águila for the 2011 Apertura season.

International career
Umaña made his debut for El Salvador in a February 2005 UNCAF Nations Cup match against Panama and has earned a total of 10 caps, scoring 1 goal. He has represented his country in 3 FIFA World Cup qualification matches and played at the 2005 UNCAF Nations Cup,

His final international game was a July 2008 friendly match against Guatemala.

International goals
Scores and results list El Salvador's goal tally first.

References

1981 births
Living people
People from San Vicente, El Salvador
Association football midfielders
Salvadoran footballers
El Salvador international footballers
C.D. FAS footballers
A.D. Isidro Metapán footballers
C.D. Águila footballers
2005 UNCAF Nations Cup players